Ernesto Leonardo Velasco Rodríguez (born 13 September 1963) is a Chilean politician and teacher of History and Geography.

He was president of the Radical Social Democrat Party from 2014 to 2018. On 24 August 2015, he joined with Li Baorong, Ambassador of China in Chile during the second government of Michelle Bachelet (2014–2018).

References

External links
 Interview at La Nación Newspaper

1963 births
Living people
Chilean people
University of La Serena alumni
Radical Party of Chile politicians
Radical Social Democratic Party of Chile politicians
21st-century Chilean politicians
Chilean Freemasons